The 2007 FIA GT Vodafone Bucharest Challenge was the third round of the 2007 FIA GT Championship season and was organised by City Challenge GmbH.  It took place on May 20, 2007.

It is only the second temporary street course run by the FIA GT Championship since its inception.  The circuit, known as the Bucharest Ring, runs around the Palace of Parliament in the Romanian capital.

Official results
Class winners in bold.  Cars failing to complete 75% of winner's distance marked as Not Classified (NC).  Cars with a C under their class are running in the Citation Cup, with the winner marked in bold italics.

Statistics
 Pole Position – #12 Scuderia Playteam Sarafree – 1:14.214
 Average Speed – 111.11 km/h

External links
 Official FIA GT website – Race Results

B
FIA GT Bucharest 2 hours